Stepan Vasil'evich Smolensky (Russian: Сте́пан Васи́льевич Смоле́нский, 1848 – 1909) was a choir director and scholar of ancient Russian chant.

Smolensky was a graduate of the Faculties of Jurisprudence and Philology of Kazan University; during his studies, he had also taken private lessons on violin and piano. From the early 1870s he made a study of ancient church chant, publishing several books on znamenny chant and a catalogue of the musical manuscripts held in the library of the Solovetsky Monastery.

In 1889 he settled in Moscow, becoming professor of history and theory of church music at the Conservatory after the death of Dmitri Razumovsky. Simultaneously he became director of the Synod choir and the Moscow Synodal School, succeeding Vasily Sergeevich Orlov: his success in these posts resulted in his being appointed director of the Saint Petersburg Court Capella on 6/19 May 1901, a post he held until 1903.

References

Citations

Sources

 Dunlop, Carolyn C (2000). The Russian Court Chapel Choir 1796-1917. Harwood Academic Publishers.
Morosan, Vladimir (1994). Choral Performance in Pre-Revolutionary Russia. Musica Russica. 
Zvereva, Svetlana (2003). Alexander Kastalsky: His Life and Music. Ashgate. 

1849 births
1909 deaths
Russian choral conductors
Russian male conductors (music)
Russian musicologists
Burials at Arskoe Cemetery
19th-century musicologists